This is a list of National Historic Sites in the province of Nova Scotia.  As of April 2021, there were 91 National Historic Sites designated in Nova Scotia, 26 of which are administered by Parks Canada (identified below by the beaver icon .

Numerous National Historic Events also occurred across Nova Scotia, and are identified at places associated with them, using the same style of federal plaque which marks National Historic Sites. Several National Historic Persons are commemorated throughout the province in the same way. The markers do not indicate which designation—a Site, Event, or Person—a subject has been given.

This list uses names designated by the national Historic Sites and Monuments Board, which may differ from other names for these sites.

National Historic Sites

See also

Heritage Property Act (Nova Scotia)
History of Nova Scotia
List of historic places in Nova Scotia

References

 
Nova Scotia